Professor Lawrence Nield is a retired Australian architect, who since 2012 has been head of the Heritage Council of New South Wales.  He is also known for his writings on urban design.  He was head of master planning for the 2000 Sydney Olympic Games. He was one of the founders of BVN Architecture (formerly Bligh Voller Nield).

In March 2013 Nield was appointed the Northern Territory Government Architect. In 2010 Lawrence Nield founded Studio Nield with his partner Andrea Nield in Sydney.

He won the Australian Institute of Architects 2012 Gold Medal for Outstanding Achievement, and the French Republic's Order of Arts and Letters in 2007, and the 1997 Sir Zelman Cowen Award for Public Architecture, which he won with his design of the Sunshine Coast University Library.

Designs
Nield's designs include:
 Ultimo Community Centre, Sydney, NSW
 UNSW L5 Building, Sydney,  (2005) – 2007 RIBA International Award
 Sunshine Coast University Library, Maroochydore, Queensland (1997) – 1998 RAIA Sir Zelman Cowen Award for Public Building
 Questacon, Canberra, ACT
 St Vincent's Hospital
 The King's School gymnasium
 10 Mort Street, Canberra, ACT
 David Maddison Clinical Sciences Building, Newcastle, NSW
 Cook and Phillip Aquatic Centre, Sydney, NSW
 Olympic Green Tennis Center, Beijing
 Sydney International Tennis Centre, (1998) – 1999 RAIA NSW Sulman Award
 Overseas Passenger Terminal, Sydney, (1988) – 1988 RAIA National Civic Design Award
 Caroline Chisholm High School, ACT, (1986)
 Mount Druitt Hospital, (1982) – 1983 RAIA NSW Chapter Merit Award Architectural Works
 David Maddison Building – Clinical Sciences Building, University of Newcastle, (1981) – 1982 RAIA NSW Chapter Merit Award

References

New South Wales architects
Recipients of the Royal Australian Institute of Architects’ Gold Medal
Living people
Date of birth missing (living people)
Architects from Sydney
University of Sydney alumni
1941 births